Cecil Reign Taylor Jr. (October 31, 1933 – May 20, 2022) was an American football player who played for the Los Angeles Rams of the National Football League (NFL). He played college football at Kansas State University.

References

1933 births
2022 deaths
Kansas State Wildcats football players
Los Angeles Rams players
American football defensive backs
Players of American football from Kansas City, Missouri
American football running backs